Manish Malhotra (born December 5 1966) is an Indian fashion designer, couturier, costume stylist, entrepreneur, filmmaker, revivalist based in Mumbai, India.

The founder of the eponymous label, Manish Malhotra, he has been deeply entrenched in the twin worlds of fashion and film for the past three decades. He has styled and designed for more than thousands of movies and won numerous awards. He is known for redefining and modernizing how actors look in Indian films and reviving some of the country's forgotten crafts. 

The recipient of several awards, Malhotra rose to prominence for his elaborate work in cinema with Bollywood, Telugu, Tamil, Hollywood, Television, and the Fashion industry. 

Malhotra became famous for his outlook on the importance of costumes in films, often becoming a part of the narration and script reading process to develop costumes for films.

Malhotra has been felicitated with Priyadarshini Memorial Award for his contribution to the fashion industry. Filmfare introduced the Filmfare Award for Best Costume Design in 1996 to acknowledge Malhotra for his styling and designing work in the film Rangeela (1995).

Since 2018, Manish has launched four other new verticals - Manish Malhotra Beauty, Manish Malhotra Jewellery, a Film Production company, and Home decor. 

He is set to make his directorial debut with a musical love story, set against the backdrop of the partition, produced by Dharma Productions.

Accoladed as a pioneer in the Indian design space, Malhotra's areas of creativity span the broad spheres of cinema, design, styling, diffusion, timeless bridal couture, jewelry, beauty, film direction, virtual store, and now tech with his recent launch of NFT's in the blockchain business.

Early life and bio 
Manish Malhotra was born to a Punjabi family in Mumbai, India. He studied at the Sacred Heart Boys High School, Mumbai.

Growing up, he was heavily influenced by Bollywood films  – the songs, the storytelling, the colors, the costumes, the actors who adorned them and made it a point to watch every film which released in cinemas. As he had a knack for sketching, he joined a painting class in the tenth grade as per his brother's suggestion.  

From watching films, painting, being surrounded by mother's clothes, recreating her sarees, being strongly opinionated about his family's sartorial choices, his love for fashion, styling, and cinema grew. 

While studying Arts at Elphinstone College in Mumbai, Manish was 19 when he forayed into modeling ad campaigns for brands like Fu's, Weekender, Frooti, and Goldspot. He managed to save Rs 90,000 through his modeling gigs and flew to Bangkok and Singapore in a quest to explore the world. 

On his return at the onset, he joined a boutique in Bandra called Equinox, where he spent his time sketching and draping the mannequins for a year, which paid him lower than 500 Indian rupees per month. 

In 1987, he decided to hire two tailors and started taking customized couture orders from his house. He wished to showcase his collection at Ensemble but didn't have the monetary means to create them at that point in time.

In 1989, he was offered a chance to style the celebrated actress Divya Bharti in a song sequence for a film by David Dhawan. However, the film was later shelved.

Though he did not have a formal education in fashion design, Malhotra's love for sketching, painting, and his passion for cinema and clothes saw him veer towards the world of films and styling. He debuted in the Hindi Film Industry as a costume stylist in 1990. Since then, Malhotra has dressed an entire generation of Bollywood actors and their progeny on-screen while also extending his aesthetics with his private label.

He describes his Bollywood forte as "an entire, integrated look for a character throughout a film."

Career

Stylist and designer 
Malhotra made his costume designing debut with the film Swarg (1990), starring Rajesh Khanna, Govinda and Juhi Chawla.

The same year, his gateway to the fashion industry opened when Rakesh Sreshtha, a photographer, introduced him to the late Sridevi to style her photoshoot looks.

His creative process as a costume stylist began with script readings – an unheard-of practice in Hindi films then. He believed that costumes were an integral part of visual storytelling to make the characters more relatable to the audience. 

Malhotra was known to be the first costume stylist and designer to view the film as a whole. He advised the actresses and filmmakers on aspects where the character's look would just be a subset of the overall creative input, lending the costume looks their due credit. 

In 1993, he designed a complete look for the late Sridevi's character in Mahesh Bhatt's Gumrah.

The designer said it was during the shooting of the Telugu thriller Govinda Govinda (1994) when Ram Gopal Varma first noticed his designs for Sridevi and reached out to him for Rangeela (1995). The film proved a career-changing experience for him as the success of the film and the popularity of the fashion trends the film established led Filmfare to introduce a new category for costume designing, the Filmfare Award for Best Costume Design, with Malhotra being its first recipient. 

Malhotra was credited for his modern and minimal yet impactful costume styling - be it the chiffon sarees in "Hai Rama”, the tangerine skater dress and the printed dress on a white base in "Tanha Tanha", the pleated skirts and boyfriend shorts in "Rangeela Re", or the Chaplinesque look in "Kya Kare Kya Na Kare". The casual style  of Urmila Matondkar, who played the film's central protagonist - from co-ords, skater dresses, leotards with scarves to oversized shirts, high-waist jeans with figure-hugging tees, and wool berets - were noted to be one of the main talking points of the film.

In 1997, Malhotra was offered a styling and designing project for Yash Raj Chopra's Dil To Pagal Hai. The film depicts the love lives of the cast and crew in a musical dance troupe while introducing stylish athleisure wear, sheer traditional outfits, and minimal styling to Hindi Cinema. From bicycle shorts, sports bras, wrist bands on Karisma Kapoor to Madhuri Dixit's sheer salwar suit sets in lace and chiffon symbolic of her coy nature; made most Indian women line up at the shops for copies. 

The costumes, looks and styling of Karan Johar's Kuch Kuch Hota Hai created an absolute frenzy back in 1998, courtesy of the man behind the fashion department, Malhotra, for which he won 7 individual category awards. The DKNY tracksuits, activewear, uber-casual sweatshirts, logo tees, and denim adorned by Kajol or the minimal dress to co-ords layered with oversized outerwear and the high-octane mini dress worn by Rani Mukerji, In the latter half of the film, Kajol was seen draped in sheer sarees with a hint of lace, or solid versions with an emphasis on the blouse; pastel hues and layering kurtas with sleek trousers which came to the forefront, bringing with them a timeless appeal. The off-route orange and beige lehenga as opposed to the go-to bridal red iteration. From athleisure, casual to bridal looks, Malhotra garnered recognition to create an array of fashion-forward looks now omnipresent and trendsetting.

In 1999, Johar hired Malhotra to design for his multi-starrer family drama Kabhi Khushi Kabhie Gham... (2001). Malhotra styled Kareena Kapoor's look in the film, which helped cement her position as a true style icon of Bollywood and set the entire tone for the film. The styling of the film earned Malhotra high acclaim - right from the red coordinated set of sequin top with bell-bottom pants from "You Are My Soniya", the pastel pink choli-pants paired with an asymmetrical cut bodice from "Bole Chudiyaan", to the yellow strapless top with the sunflower choker and ombre sunglasses, shimmer crop tops, mini-skirts, leather pants, jackets, scarves and fur collars. Malhotra's styling in the film is perceived to be timeless, relevant and inspirational for every generation.

In 2001, Malhotra won his first IIFA Award for Best Costume Design for his work in Aditya Chopra's Mohabbatein.

In 2003, Malhotra styled Johar's Kal Ho Naa Ho, a romantic comedy-drama based on NRI's living in New York City. Preity Zinta's statement pieces included scarves, trench coats, halter dresses (including the now-iconic red one from "Kuch Toh Hua Hai"), sweaters, slip dresses, flared pants, and one-shoulder dresses - all relevant to the era and character. Shah Rukh Khan and Saif Ali Khan's embroidered kurtas and Zinta's blue "Maahi Ve" lehenga, and Jaya Bachchan's makeover look, which including jeans, sweaters, sweatshirts and long trench and overcoats also received acclaim.

The same year, he designed the wedding outfits for Karishma Kapoor subsequently leading to inquiries from high-profile clientele like the Raheja Builders and many more. 

In 2004, Malhotra generated quite a buzz after styling Sushmita Sen in Farah Khan's Main Hoon Na, in flowy chiffon sarees, vibrant colors, and prints 

Malhotra is known for making women feel sultry in sarees. 

In 2006, Johar once again reached out to Malhotra to style the entire cast of his ensemble musical romantic drama Kabhi Alvida Naa Kehna. Malhotra received widespread acclaim for his styling in the film - right from Shah Rukh Khan's preppy athleisure wear, Rani Mukherji's chiffon sarees, halter blouses and trench coats, Abhishek Bachchan's working guy formal wear, Preity Zinta's chic fashionista skirts, scarves, tops and dresses, Amitabh Bachchan's classic suits to Kirron Kher's homely long skirts, sweaters, stoles and kurtas - all of which received praise from critics and the audience. 

In 2007, Malhotra styled Kareena Kapoor's character, Geet in the film Jab We Met. The film saw the rise of harem pants paired with long t-shirts, phulkari scarves, corset tops (with the popular red skirt), and hoop earrings with short kurtas. 

In 2008, Malhotra was widely praised for Priyanka Chopra's look in the film Dostana. Based in Miami. the vibe of the film was cool chic, and so were the costumes. It saw her in the iconic shimmering golden swimsuit, and her classic silver saree with a sensuous blouse from the song "Desi Girl" launched many versions of the same.

In 2013, Malhotra styled and designed the look for Deepika Padukone's character, Naina Talwar, in Ayan Mukerji's Yeh Jawaani Hai Deewani. The electric blue saree with a black shimmer blouse, her form-fitting kurtas with plunging necklines, low waist lehengas with short blouses, or floral dresses paired with sweaters and denim jackets, Malhotra's outfits received a lot of attention and praise. 

His body of work of over 1000 films and designing innumerable looks for actors including Rekha, Sridevi, Raveena Tandon, Kajol, Sushmita Sen to the generation of Aishwarya Rai Bachchan, Priyanka Chopra, Kareena Kapoor Khan, Deepika Padukone, Katrina Kaif, Anushka Sharma, Alia Bhatt, Janhvi Kapoor, Sara Ali Khan, Ananya Pandey, and many others, Malhotra has been telling stories through all his creations for three decades now. 

The veteran was bestowed with the Filmfare Award for 30 years of outstanding contribution to Bollywood fashion. 

The visionary, revivalist, designer continues to accolade with many prestigious awards to date.

Entrepreneur 
His label "Manish Malhotra" is synonymous with opulent, contemporary, and larger-than-life glamour Indian wear.

In 1999, he collaborated with his friends, the industrialist Kajal Anand, Avanti, and Yash Birla for a brief period to design collections for their store, Reverie.

Manish Malhotra tied up with Sheetal Design Studio and set up a workshop there. He virtually became a face of the Sheetal Design Studio, and exclusively retailed out of their store at Bombay's Grant Road for 4 years. 

After claiming his position as a costume director, stylist, and Hindi Film Industry fashion designer, he launched his couture label Manish Malhotra in 2005. It offers bridal, couture, diffusion, men's wear, and bespoke collections that now retail at four Mumbai, New Delhi, and Hyderabad stores. 

In 2006, Manish Malhotra teamed up with Saif Belhasa Group of Companies to open his first flagship store in Dubai that catered to Arab and Global customers. The collection portrayed a range of specially designed shelas, abhayas and jalabiyas, an amalgamation of traditional craft and modern design sensibilities to reflect the essence of his designs. The store later shut in 2017.

In 2008, he opened his first two flagship stores in Khar West, Mumbai, India.

In 2013, Manish Malhotra was the first Indian designer to have opened the largest, Indian stand-alone store sprawled over 6,000 sq.ft, located in a gorgeous haveli on Kalkadas Marg in Mehrauli, Delhi. The space reflects Malhotra's trademark opulent style with arched windows, high ceilings, and vintage chandeliers. 

(https://www.idiva.com/fashion/how-to/first-look-manish-malhotras-delhi-store/photogallery/25793)

In 2017, Manish launched the Hyderabad store, which spreads over 15,000 sq. ft. It is located in the city's posh Jubilee Hills locality to meet the designer's grand visionary identity. 

Over the years, the label's aesthetic has aimed to bring together traditional Indian craftsmanship with contemporary silhouettes like gowns with intricate gold embroidery, cigarette pants paired with long jackets for women, voluminous lehengas worn with cropped blouses, or the use of non-traditional colors like royal blue, soft pink, maroon, etc., in bridal ensembles. The label's design language is claimed to exhibit glamour and is a reflection of modern India. 

In 2019, many actresses wore the signature "Manish Malhotra saree" that the designer introduced in a variety of colours.

He launched his first-ever haute-couture make-up line, 'Manish Malhotra Beauty', in collaboration with My Glamm in December 2018. 

2019, the celebrity couturier ventured into a new space, 'Manish Malhotra Jewellery' in partnership with heritage jeweler brand Raniwala 1881.  The curation is a medley of heritage with a modern touch, much like his line of clothes, entailing an expansive range of chandbalis, danglers, studs, jhumkis, kadas, chokers, layered necklaces in a combination of uncut palkis, emeralds, diamonds, jadau, coloured stones and pearls. 

Reliance Brands Limited (RBL) - part of the retail arm of billionaire Mukesh Ambani-owned Reliance Industries acquired a 40 percent stake in brand 'Manish Malhotra' (within the lifestyle space domain) to accelerate the 16-year old couture house's growth in India and across the globe. On Friday, October 15, Reliance Brands and Manish Malhotra announced a strategic partnership as part of the deal. This is the first external investment for Manish Malhotra's brand, which has been privately held by the designer so far. The brand will continue to be led by Manish Malhotra, as Managing and Creative Director after the partnership with Reliance.

Digital venture 

On January 14, 2021, Manish Malhotra was the first in the Indian design space to launch the first-ever virtual store.

The designer's virtual store allows the customers to walk through the Delhi flagship store spanning over 15,000 sq. ft. The virtual tour's design house is built with online navigation systems and custom configurations, and customers can walk through the aisles, zoom in on the products, and get the item's details.

In addition, guests traveling on Etihad Airways got the chance to watch the normal version of the movie as part of the flight’s inflight entertainment.

The NFT collection had the sketches and GIFs of five couture pieces worn by famous artists like Lisa Ray, Deepika Padukone, Kareena Kapoor Khan, and Alia Bhatt. The auctioning was done in WRX—which is the native token of WazirX based on the Binance blockchain. The dropped collection made the sale within 12 seconds.

Manish Malhotra has been a judge panellist on a reality show called Myntra Fashion Superstar, aimed at identifying India’s next big fashion influencer on the Myntra App.class.org.in

Runway 
Manish Malhotra, the designer, started his Productions arm in 2018 with India's most elite and beau monde wedding of Isha Ambani and Anand Piramal. The entire Sangeet event was conceptualized, curated, and executed by Manish Malhotra Productions. Guests included global business tycoons, politicians, sports stars, Hollywood, Bollywood personalities, and International celebrities such as Hillary Clinton and Beyoncé.

Cinema has defined, decorated, fired and fuelled Malhotra’s work—an aspect and quality he masterfully employed to present his recent collections.

To conclude India Couture Week (ICW) 2020, Malhotra was the first in the Indian fashion space to stage the grand finale in a virtual format with ‘Ruhaniyat’ —a medium that gave him the chance to sit in the director’s chair and visualize clothes as characters. The couture film conjured a mood of mysticism laced by the Sufi notes of singer Abi Sampa and musician Rushil Ranjan. Malhotra’s inspiration is pivoted on the princely histories of Punjab and Awadh, with styling, music and the overall old-word opulence borrowed from the Mughal era bringing forth the real fraction of the Awadhi-Punjabi repertoire with voluminous silhouettes, deft embroidery, and layerings. Janhvi Kapoor, the young film star and daughter of the late Bollywood actor Sridevi, became the revered muse, invoking bridal emotions at different points in the fashion film. 

The multi-faceted designer introduced his timeless and seasonless 'Nooraniyat' collection through a couture film in April 2021, featuring the millennial actress Sara Ali Khan and Kriti Sanon for the bridal collection. The couture video hallmarks his three decades of designing for film and the runway. 

(https://www.bollywoodhungama.com/news/features/kriti-sanon-looks-royal-latest-snaps-manish-malhotras-nooraniyat-collection/)

After reshaping Bollywood's fashion story, designer Manish Malhotra will go behind the camera and make his directorial debut with a musical love story set in the backdrop of the partition, produced by Dharma Productions.

Digital Venture 
Manish Malhotra marked another first to add to his repertoire of accomplishments. He partnered with Etihad Airways to become the first Indian designer to create a virtual reality fashion show filmed using the pioneering technology at Lakme Fashion Week in Mumbai in August, 2016. All the goings-on, both onstage and backstage, were covered with 360-degree cameras for the world to see. In addition, guests traveling on Etihad Airways got the chance to watch the normal version of the movie as part of the inflight entertainment.

On January 14, 2021, Manish Malhotra was the first in the Indian design space to launch the first-ever virtual store.

The designer's virtual store allows the customers to walk through the Delhi flagship store spanning over 15,000 sq. ft. The virtual tour's design house is built with online navigation systems and custom configurations, and customers can walk through the aisles, zoom in on the products, and get the item's details.

In 2021, Manish Malhotra was the first Indian designer forayed into the crypto world with his first-ever collection of non-fungible tokens (NFTs) — unique digital items that can be bought using cryptocurrencies. The NFT collection had the sketches and GIFs of five couture pieces worn by famous artists like Lisa Ray, Deepika Padukone, Kareena Kapoor Khan, and Alia Bhatt.

The auctioning was done in WRX—which is the native token of WazirX based on the Binance blockchain. The dropped collection made the sale within 12 seconds.

Manish Malhotra has been a significant judge panellist on a unique reality show called Myntra Fashion Superstar, aimed at identifying India’s next big fashion influencer on the Myntra App.

Achint Setia, VP & Business Head, Social Commerce, Myntra, said : “As it enters its third edition, Myntra Fashion Superstar is a fashion, entertainment, and content space, creating a strong fan-following by driving relevant conversations around authenticity, inclusivity and challenging societal norms for the better. This edition will focus on shaping mindsets around celebrating unfiltered, and real conversations alongside the most relevant and credible voices.

Social Sustainability

First Shows

London 
Malhotra has made contributions to India's largest education NGO, Pratham, once in 2013 and then in 2016. Manish Malhotra celebrated 100 years of Indian Cinema at the ARTiculate the Pratham Ball 2013, in London and raised 3,00,000 pounds for the Indian Education Charity. His collection was inspired by the three main eras of Indian Cinema, spanning from 1913 to 2013. It took the audience through the black and white era of "Mughal-E-Azam" and "Awara".

Houston 
Again on 23 April 2016, at the Pratham's Annual Gala, held at Hilton America's, Manish Malhotra raised $1.8 million to eradicate illiteracy in India

Angel! Foundation (London) 
Manish Malhotra debuted his exquisite collection at a spectacular gala evening in aid of The Angeli Foundation and in association with Rivaage Boutique that took place at the Grosvenor House Hotel on 23rd February 2013. Angel Foundation is a charity that works towards the empowerment of women in India and fights the cause of female foeticide and related crimes against women in India. Manish in support of the Angel! Foundation said, "I work in an industry where women are revered and respected. I have had the privilege of dressing some of the most beautiful and powerful women in the world, but when I step out of the door and into the stark reality of India, I see the injustice and inequality all around me.

Muscat Fashion Show 
On 20 February 2014, Malhotra along with 20 models from Mumbai showcased his latest creations and couture in a binding show. The show was in association with Oman Cancer Association and Dar Al’ Atta’a to support cancer awareness. The show was held on 20 February 2014 at the lawns of the Intercontinental Muscat. The RO20,000 raised during the event were donated to the Oman Cancer Association. Manish, through this show, brought to life India's regal heritage with the royalty in chiffon saris, flowing anarkalis, kalidar lehengas and double-breasted bandhgalas.[citation needed]

Save The Tiger Telethon (Aircel) 
NDTV in association with Aircel embarked upon a unique programming initiative to support its ongoing "Save our Tiger" campaign by telecasting a 12-hour nonstop program from 11 am to 11 pm, in March 20101. Malhotra was among the many generous donors like Amitabh Bachchan, Diya Mirza, Priya Dutt etc. the campaign raised about Rs. 10 crore and had a great impact on the policies.

WEvolve Blue Runway 
Malhotra introduced a new dimension to his summer collection in 2015 with ‘The Blue Runway’ at the Jabong Lakme Fashion Week 2015. The show was in association with the WEvolve campaign and World Bank as the partner. WEvolve is a global campaign bringing men and women together to end inequality using the power of art and media to inspire action and change. The highlight of the show was the finale segment where the models were seen carrying messages of change and positivity on placards that read – gender, equality, society, empower and justice. The show derived its name, ‘The Blue Runway’ from the color palette it featured – different hues of blue from powder to midnight. Also the collection was designed to be worn in any part of the world with the women's line including flowy gowns, jacket-saris, off-shoulder and halter crop tops, and skirts as and long shirts in structured and easy styles.

Honor Role By CRY America 
Malhotra also contributed to ensuring underprivileged children their basic rights. He made a generous donation of a Manish Malhotra garment at the CRY gala dinner 2017.

Among the prominent personalities who walked the ramp for them were Shabana Azmi, Sophie Choudry, Huma Qureshi, Athiya Shetty, Tara Sharma, Kajol, Riya Sen, Tisca Chopra etc.

Kashmir 
Manish Malhotra worked towards promoting the regional handicrafts of India in 2012. He associated with craftsmen of Kashmir who had been creating intricate embroideries for his label and created the Kashmiri Heritage Collection which was showcased on the third day of Wills Lifestyle India Fashion Week. His collection was Kashmir-inspired and it was a tribute to the craftsmen from Kashmir working for him for a year.

Mijwan 
Malhotra has been involved with the Mijwan Welfare Society since its very first show. Mijwan Welfare Society was founded by Kaifi Azmi that promotes the village based small-scale industries and supporting it with marketing skills and strategies and it also facilitates viable self-employment. The women of the Mijwan village have sustained themselves by learning chikankari embroidery, which Malhotra has transformed into his signature Indian wear. Kaifi Azmi Embroidery and Sewing centre was set up in 1994 and Manish Malhotra adopted the school in 2012. He showcased his 2012 Mijwan collection at the India Fashion Week held at Grand Hyatt, Mumbai to promote Mijwan's female population and their craftsmanship. In 2015, having completed 4 years of working with Mijwan Welfare Society, he put up a show on 4 April 2015. The collection was called, The Legacy and the list of showstoppers included five parent-child duos: Amitabh Bachchan and Shweta Nanda, Anil and Sonam Kapoor, Shatrugan and Sonakshi Sinha, Jaya and Abhishek Bachchan, and Javed and Farhan Akhtar.

The idea behind putting family on the forefront was simple: To represent the legacy the late Kaifi Azmi left for his daughter Shabana Azmi, who now heads the NGO of Mijwan Welfare Society along with her god daughter Namrata Goyal. In 2017, he put up his sixth Mijwan show at the Grand Hyatt, Mumbai. Shah Rukh Khan and Anushka Sharma walked the ramp for him, and the collection showcased an amalgamation of classic chikankari in modern silhouettes, renewing the vintage charm of elaborate jackets, cocktail dresses, saris, crop tops, fluid skirts and evening gowns—with rich zardozi, romantic sequins and fringes.

Save The Girl Child

2012 
To support the 'Save & Empower The Girl Child' campaign held at JW Marriott in Mumbai on 11 April 2012, Manish Malhotra put up a show where many celebrities walked the ramp with their daughters. The collection embraced traditional Indian crafts like Chikankari and Kashmiri embroidery. It traced the birth of the Indian Girl Child from soft shades to vibrant hues signaling her arrival into womanhood.

2014 
At the Lilavati hospital, Manish Malhotra put up a show to support the ‘Save the Girl Child’ campaign where Bollywood divas Madhuri Dixit Nene, Malaika Arora Khan, Mandira Bedi, and Lara Dutta walked the ramp for him.

Brand Collaborations

Manish Malhotra x Hindware, 2017 
Manish Malhotra created an eponymous collection of bathroom suites for Hindware and launched super-premium bathware brand ALCHYMI.

Femina Miss India, 2017 
Manish Malhotra recreated the romance of traditional and contemporary worlds through an exclusive range for 30 finale contestants gracing the Femina Miss India 2017 runway. For the very first time in Miss India’s history, all finalists walked the ramp wearing Indian Couture instead of western silhouettes for their final round.

Manish Malhotra x VIVO, 2018 
Smartphone maker Vivo has collaborated with Manish Malhotra and launched ‘Infinite Red’ Vivo V7+ limited edition smartphone, targeting millennials in India.

Manish Malhotra – Mughal-e-Azam 
In 2016, Manish Malhotra was associated with Director Feroz Abbas Khan for his ambitious musical adaptation of ‘Mughal-e-Azam.’ He designed all the 550 costumes for the play.

Manish Malhotra x INIFD, 2018 
Manish Malhotra joined hands with the International Institute of Fashion Design (INIFD) and London School of Trends (LST). The program facilitates students through extensive video lectures by Manish Malhotra to learn from his experience from over 30 years in film and fashion.

Manish Malhotra x Magnum, 2018 
Manish and Magnum represented the melange of glamour and fashion at Cannes in 2018.

Notable projects
In August 2016, Malhotra's show for Lakme Fashion Week's Winter-Festive edition was shot for a Virtual Reality fashion experience by Etihad Airways. The Virtual Reality video was released earlier in January 2017 at Etihad’s Innovation Centre in Abu Dhabi. He also worked with Google on launch promotions for ‘G Suite’ – a set of intelligent apps designed for modern professionals.

Manish Malhotra was invited to share his design journey at the 2017 edition of the India Conference at Harvard Business School

In 2018, Manish Malhotra was invited by the Academy of Motion Pictures Arts and Sciences to be a member.

Apart from the star-studded clientele, he has also designed clothes for International names. 

Malhotra worked on a traditional outfit design for Michael Jackson, during his visit to India in the late 1990s. 

He has also worked for Jean-Claude Van Damme, Reese Witherspoon in Mira Nair’s Vanity Fair, Kylie Minogue, and Jermaine Jackson and wife Halima

He also designed the wedding outfits for the Princess of Riyadh. 

Sundar Pichai and his wife Anjali Pichai wore Manish Malhotra outfits for a wedding ceremony in Mumbai, India.

The designer has also dressed Hillary Clinton, Kylie Minogue, and supermodels Kate Moss and Naomi Campbell.

Costume design filmography

Awards

Filmfare Award 
 1995 - Filmfare Award for Costume Design - Rangeela
 Filmfare Glamour & Style Award

Bollywood Movie Award
 1999 Bollywood Award for Costume Design - Kuch Kuch Hota Hai
 2002 Bollywood Awards Designer of Year - Kabhi Khushi Kabhie Gham...
 2005 Bollywood Awards Designer of Year - Veer-Zaara
 2007 Bollywood Awards Designer of Year - Kabhi Alvida Naa Kehna

Zee Cine Award
 Zee Cine Award Zee Cine Award for Costume Design
 Zee Cine Award for Best Costume for Mohabbatein
 Zee Cine Award - Zenith 'London' for Best Costume in 2008

IIFA Awards
 2001 IIFA Award for Best Costume - Mohabbatein
 2002 IIFA Award for Best Costume for Kabhi Khushi Kabhie Gham...
 2004 IIFA Award for Best Costume for Kal Ho Naa Ho
 Wizcraft Samsung IIFA Award for Costume Designing
 2017 IIFA Award for Best Costume Designing.

Filmfare Awards South
 2010 Filmfare Awards South for Costume Design - Enthiran

Other awards
 Masala Awards for International Asian Designer of the year in 2010
 Masa Awards for Fashion Personality in 2012
 Bollywood Fashion Awards
 Designer of the year in 2002
 Best costume designer in 2004
 Designer of the year in 2004
 Designer of the year in 2005
 Best costume designer in 2005
 Showtime Opinion Poll Award for Raja Hindustani
 Rok Glam Award Zoom for Contemporary Wear Design - Women in 2007
 Siemen's Viewer's Choice Award for Dil To Pagal Hai
 Stylish Designer Of the Year at the Elle Style Awards in 1999
 Indo American Society Award for contribution to Fashion Designing
 Indira Priyadarshini Memorial Award for his contribution to the fashion industry
 Manish was Felicitated by National Institute Of Fashion Technology
 Indian Affairs of Network 7 Media Group felicitated Manish at India Leadership Conclave 2013 as "Fashion Icon of the Decade 2013".
 SAIFTA in 2013 for Outstanding Contribution to Cinema & Fashion
 International Film Festival Of India - Goa for Excellence Award
 Rajiv Gandhi Awards for designing in 2002
 Hall of Fame for HELLO in 2014
 Rang Sadhana for Costume Designer in 2008
 AICOG Achievers Award
 MOET & Chandon Champagne for tribute to Asian fashion designing in 2006
 Power brands & Fame & Planman for Styling new India in 2012
 Hindustan Times for Most Stylish - Delhi Season 6 in 2016
 Pratham, USA for Excellence in fashion in 2016
 The Antwerp medical team for noble cause in 2006
 Lycra MTV Style Awards for Celebrity Style in 2006
 Lyrca MTC Style Awards for Bollywood designer of the year
 FICCI - Speaker in 2014 for Changing facade of fashion industry in India
 Clariden LEU for appreciation for creativity
 Magzimise Awards 2016 for creative fashion & fashion accessories

References

External links

 
 

1966 births
Living people
Indian male fashion designers
Indian costume designers
Clothing brands of India
Punjabi people
British emigrants to India
Filmfare Awards South winners
Artists from Mumbai
20th-century Indian designers
21st-century Indian designers
Filmfare Awards winners